Brian Selznick (born July 14, 1966) is an American illustrator and author best known as the writer of The Invention of Hugo Cabret (2007), Wonderstruck (2011), The Marvels (2015) and Kaleidoscope (2021). He won the 2008 Caldecott Medal for U.S. picture book illustration recognizing The Invention of Hugo Cabret. He is also known for illustrating children's books such as the covers of Scholastic's 20th-anniversary editions of the Harry Potter series.

Life and career
Selznick, the oldest of three children of a Jewish family, was born and grew up in East Brunswick, New Jersey, where he graduated in 1984 from East Brunswick High School. He is the son of Lynn (Samson) and Roger E. Selznick. His grandfather was a cousin of Hollywood producer David O. Selznick. He graduated from the Rhode Island School of Design and then worked for three years at Eeyore's Books for Children in Manhattan while working on The Houdini Box, about a boy's chance encounter with Harry Houdini and its aftermath. It became his debut work, a 56-page picture book published by Alfred A. Knopf in 1991.

Selznick won the 2008 Caldecott Medal from the American Library Association for the year's best-illustrated picture book, recognizing The Invention of Hugo Cabret. Its Caldecott Medal was the first for a long book, 533 pages with 284 pictures. Selznick calls it "not exactly a novel, not quite a picture book, not really a graphic novel, or a flip book or a movie, but a combination of all these things." At the time it was "by far the longest and most involved book I’ve ever worked on." It has inspired students to action, including a fourth-grade class that staged a silent film festival and a group of fifth graders who turned the book into a 30-minute modern dance.

The Invention of Hugo Cabret follows a young orphan in Paris in the 1930s as he tries to piece together a broken automaton. The book was inspired by a passage in the book Edison’s Eve by Gaby Wood recounting the collection of automata that belonged to Georges Méliès. After his death they were thrown away by the museum that he donated them to. Selznick, a fan of Méliès and automata, envisioned a young boy stealing an automaton from the garbage. The Invention of Hugo Cabret was adapted as a film, Hugo, by director Martin Scorsese and released in November 2011.

Selznick cites Maurice Sendak, author of Where the Wild Things Are, and Remy Charlip, author of Fortunately, as strong influences on his books The Invention of Hugo Cabret and Wonderstruck.

Before winning the 2008 Caldecott Medal, Selznick had been a runner-up for the award, winning a Caldecott Honor in 2002 for The Dinosaurs of Waterhouse Hawkins: An Illuminating History of Mr. Waterhouse Hawkins, Artist and Lecturer. Other awards include the Texas Bluebonnet Award, the Rhode Island Children's Book Award, and the Christopher Award.

Works

As writer

 "A Buried History of Paleontology", by Selznick and David Serlin, Cabinet 28: Bones (Winter 2007/08)
 The Hugo Movie Companion: A Behind the Scenes Look at How a Beloved Book Became a Major Motion Picture; with additional material by Martin Scorsese and David Serlin (Scholastic, 2011)

As writer and illustrator
 The Houdini Box (1991) 
 The Robot King (1995) 
 Boy of a Thousand Faces (2000) 
 The Invention of Hugo Cabret (2007),  historical steampunk novel
 Wonderstruck (2011), a historical novel
 The Marvels (2015)
 Baby Monkey, Private Eye (2018), early reader by Brian Selznick and David Serlin
 Kaleidoscope (2021)

As illustrator

 Doll Face Has a Party (1994), picture book by Pam Conrad
 Our House: stories of Levittown (1995), by Pam Conrad — about Levittown
 Frindle (1996), novella by Andrew Clements
 The Boy Who Longed for a Lift (1997), picture book by Norma Farber
 Riding Freedom (1998), by Pam Muñoz Ryan — about Charley Parkhurst, fictionalized
 Amelia and Eleanor Go For a Ride: based on a true story (1999), by Pam Muñoz Ryan — about Amelia Earhart fictionalized
 Barnyard Prayers (2000), picture book by Laura Godwin
 The Doll People (2000), novel by Ann M. Martin and Laura Godwin
 The Landry News (2000, paperback), novella by Andrew Clements (1999)
 The Dinosaurs of Waterhouse Hawkins (2001), by Barbara Kerley — about Benjamin Waterhouse Hawkins
 The School Story (2001), by Andrew Clements
 When Marian Sang (2002), by Pam Muñoz Ryan — about Marian Anderson
 Wingwalker (2002), by Rosemary Wells 
 The Dulcimer Boy (2003), novel by Tor Seidler 
 The Meanest Doll in the World (2003), by Martin and Godwin, book 2
 Walt Whitman: words for America (2004), by Barbara Kerley — about Walt Whitman
 Lunch Money (2005), novel by Andrew Clements
 Marly's Ghost: a remix of Charles Dickens's A Christmas Carol (2006), by David Levithan
 The Runaway Dolls (2008), by Martin and Godwin, book 3
 12: a novel (2009, Feiwel and Friends; ; also Twelve)
 Live Oak, with Moss (2019)

References

Further reading
 Llanas, Sheila Griffin. Brian Selznick (Minneapolis: ABDO Pub., 2012) — Checkerboard biography library, Children's illustrators, 24 pages

External links

 Official Website
 Interview by Scholastic students
 Brian Selznick at Reading Rockets, includes video interview
 
 
 Baby Monkey, Private Eye by Brian Selznick and Doctor David Serlin
 The Marvels
 Wonderstruck
 The Invention of Hugo Cabret

1966 births
American children's writers
American historical novelists
American male novelists
American puppeteers 
Caldecott Medal winners
American children's book illustrators
American gay writers
Living people
People from East Brunswick, New Jersey
East Brunswick High School alumni
Rhode Island School of Design alumni
MacDowell Colony fellows
Inkpot Award winners
21st-century American LGBT people